van der Hoop may refer to:

Adriaan van der Hoop (1778–1854), Dutch banker and art collector whose collection laid the basis for the Rijksmuseum
Joan Cornelis van der Hoop (1742–1825), Dutch lawyer and politician, father of Adriaan (1778–1854)
Johannes Hermanus van der Hoop (1887–1950), Dutch psychiatrist

Surnames of Dutch origin